Resilience is an album released in 2008 by Annabelle Chvostek.  The album was recorded with producers Roma Baran and Vivian Stoll (Unknown Gender, Isis). It includes a co-write with Canadian Bruce Cockburn.

Canadian sessions were funded by a grant from the Canada Council for the Arts, and include guest appearances by Bruce Cockburn, Michael Jerome Brown, Debashis Sinha, Becky Foon, Jordi Rosen and members of the :fr:Lake of Stew.

Other guests include Mary Gauthier, Bruce Molsky and Julie Wolf.

Track listing
 Resilience (3:42)
 Seven Years (3:47)
 Runaway Lane (3:06)
 Wait for It (3:27)
 Piece of You (3:21)
 Racing with the Sun (2:46)
 The Sioux (4:02)
 Driving Away (4:46) (with Bruce Cockburn)
 I Left My Brain (5:38)
 Firewalker (3:30)
 Line of Ascent (3:52)
 Nashville (3:54)

Annabelle Chvostek albums
2008 albums